Lenya National Park is a proposed national park in Myanmar. By 2011, the national park was not yet gazetted and its boundaries still not demarcated.

The endangered Gurney's pitta (Hydrornis gurneyi) was rediscovered in the area of the proposed park in 2003. Large portions of land are being converted to oil palm and timber plantations.

See also
List of protected areas in Burma

References

External links 

National parks of Myanmar
Tenasserim Hills
Tanintharyi Region
Important Bird Areas of Myanmar